Jack Daly may refer to:
Jack Daly (politician) (1915–1988), Irish politician
Jack Daly (hurler) (1889–?), Irish hurler
Jack Daly (rugby union) (born 1998), Irish rugby union player
John Daly (rugby) (1917–1988), Irish rugby union and rugby league player, known as Jack

See also
Jackie Daly (born 1945), Irish button accordion and concertina player